Akuglek Island is an uninhabited island in the Qikiqtaaluk Region of Nunavut, Canada. It is located in Davis Strait, southeast of Sakiak Fiord, off southeastern Baffin Island's Cumberland Peninsula. Angijak Island is to its northeast, Nuvuktik Island to its south. Other islands in the immediate vicinity include Kekertaluk Island and Kekertuk Island.

References

External links 
 Akuglek Island in the Atlas of Canada - Toporama; Natural Resources Canada

Islands of Baffin Island
Islands of Davis Strait
Uninhabited islands of Qikiqtaaluk Region